The 2008 NCAA Division I FCS football season, the 2008 season of college football for teams in the Football Championship Subdivision (FCS), began on August 28, 2008, and concluded on December 19, 2008, in Chattanooga, Tennessee, at the 2008 NCAA Division I Football Championship Game, where the Richmond Spiders defeated the Montana Grizzlies to win the NCAA Division I Football Championship.

Rule changes for 2008
The NCAA football rules committee made several rule changes for 2008, and includes the following:
The 25-second play clock was replaced by a 40-second version similar to one that was used in the NFL until 2005.
The penalty for kicking the ball out of bounds on the kickoff is increased, placing the ball at the 40-yard line, similar to the NFL.
All face-mask penalties result in a 15-yard penalty. Incidental contact with the face mask is no longer penalized.
All horse-collar tackles are now subject to a 15-yard penalty.
If a coach challenges a play and they win the challenge, they are given a second challenge to use later in the game, and each coach has a maximum of two challenges per game even if both are decided in their favor.

In addition to the rules changes, this was the first season in which a standard provision of NCAA rules allowed FCS teams to schedule 12 regular-season games (not counting conference championship games). In years when the period starting with the Thursday before Labor Day and ending with the final Saturday in November contains 14 Saturdays, FCS programs may play 12 games instead of the regular 11.

Conference and program changes
The Gateway Football Conference changed its name to its now-current name, Missouri Valley Football Conference.
Following the 2007 season, the Metro Atlantic Athletic Conference was forced to drop its football sponsorship after La Salle dropped its program. The two remaining teams, Iona and Marist, were forced to become independents. Iona would eventually drop its own program at the end of the 2008 season.

FCS team wins over FBS teams
August 30 – Cal Poly 29, San Diego State 27
September 6 – New Hampshire 28, Army 10

Notable upsets
August 30 –  21,  0 (Division II over Division I FCS)
August 31 –  33,  22 (Division II over Division I FCS)
September 4 –  21,  0 (NAIA over Division I FCS non-scholarship)
September 4 –  35,  27 (Division II over Division I FCS)
September 5 –  14, Wagner 13 (Division II over Division I FCS)
September 6 –  32, Campbell 21 (Division III over Division I FCS non-scholarship)
September 6 –  21,  9 (Division II over Division I FCS non-scholarship)
September 6 –  34,  0 (Division II over Division I FCS)
September 13 –  31,  28 (Division III over Division I FCS non-scholarship)
September 20 –  22,  21 (Division II over Division I FCS non-scholarship)
September 20 –  13,  10 (NAIA over Division I FCS non-scholarship)
October 4 –  34,  24 (Division II over Division I FCS)
October 11 –  23,  12 (Division III over Division I FCS non-scholarship)

Conference standings

Conference champions

Automatic berths

Invitation

Abstains

*Overall record, Conference record

Postseason

NCAA Division I playoff bracket

* Host institution

SWAC Championship Game

Gridiron Classic
The Gridiron Classic is an annual game between the champions of the Northeast Conference and the Pioneer Football League that has been held since December 2006.

Final poll standings

Standings are from The Sports Network final 2008 poll.

References